CCF can refer to:

Computing
 Confidential Consortium Framework, a free and open source blockchain infrastructure framework developed by Microsoft
 Customer Care Framework, a Microsoft product

Finance
 Credit conversion factor converts the amount of a free credit line and other off-balance-sheet transactions to its credit exposure equivalent, i.e. an Exposure at default
 Common contractual fund, an Irish collective investment scheme
 Crédit Commercial de France, a defunct French bank, now part of HSBC

Health care
 Congestive cardiac failure

Organisations
 Cambodian Children's Fund, a charity organisation
 Center for Consumer Freedom, a food industry advocacy group
 Cheetah Conservation Fund, a Namibian wildlife conservation organization
 China Carbon Forum, a non-profit organization promoting climate change stakeholder dialogue
 China Computer Federation, Chinese association for computing professionals
 Combined Cadet Force, British-government sponsored organisation for youth military training

Politics
 Conservative Christian Fellowship, an organisation allied with the British Conservative Party
 Conservative Collegiate Forum, the United Kingdom Conservative party's student organisation from 1986 to 1998
 Co-operative Commonwealth Federation, historic Canadian political party

Sport
 Cyprus Cycling Federation, a Cypriot bicycling organization

Transport
 Canadian Car and Foundry, a Canadian manufacturer of rail cars and buses
 CCF, IATA code for Carcassonne Salvaza Airport in France

Other
 Cartoon Cartoon Fridays, a former programming block from Cartoon Network
 Centum cubic feet (100 cubic feet), an American standard unit of measurement for the volume of water or natural gas, sometimes capitalized as "Ccf" (from the Roman numeral for 100, C; see also Therm)
 Christ's Commission Fellowship, a non-denominational evangelical Christian church based in the Philippines
 Concentrated Complete Fertiliser, a product of Imperial Chemical Industries (ICI); see History of fertilizer
 Concentric crater fill, a geologic feature observed in impact craters on Mars
 Congress for Cultural Freedom, an anti-Communist advocacy group, dissolved in 1979
 Corpus Carminum Færoensium, a collection of Faroese folk ballads